The ECMWF reanalysis project is a meteorological reanalysis project carried out by the European Centre for Medium-Range Weather Forecasts (ECMWF). 
The first reanalysis product, ERA-15, generated reanalyses for approximately 15 years, from December 1978 to February 1994. The second product, ERA-40 (originally intended as a 40-year reanalysis) begins in 1957 (the International Geophysical Year) and covers 45 years to 2002. As a precursor to a revised extended reanalysis product to replace ERA-40, ECMWF released ERA-Interim, which covers the period from 1979 to 2019.
A new reanalysis product ERA5 has recently been released by ECMWF as part of Copernicus Climate Change Services. This product has higher spatial resolution (31 km) and covers the period from 1979 to present. Extension up to 1950 became available in 2020.

In addition to reanalysing all the old data using a consistent system, the reanalyses also make use of much archived data that was not available to the original analyses. This allows for the correction of many historical hand-drawn maps where the estimation of features was common in areas of data sparsity. The ability is also present to create new maps of atmosphere levels that were not commonly used until more recent times.

Generation
Many sources of the meteorological observations were used, including radiosondes, balloons, aircraft, buoyes, satellites, scatterometers. This data was run through the ECMWF computer model at a 125 km resolution. As the ECMWF's computer model is one of the more highly regarded in the field of forecasting, many scientists take its reanalysis to have similar merit. The data is stored in GRIB format. The reanalysis was done in an effort to improve the accuracy of historical weather maps and aid in a more detailed analysis of various weather systems through a period that was severely lacking in computerized data. With the data from reanalyses such as this, many of the more modern computerized tools for analyzing storm systems can be utilized, at least in part, because of this access to a computerized simulation of the atmospheric state.

Accessing the data
The ECMWF re-analysis products are accessible from the Climate Change Services homepage. The data can be downloaded for research use from ECMWF's homepage (see external links) and the National Center for Atmospheric Research data archives. Both require registration.
A Python web API can be used to download a subset of parameters for a selected region and time period.

See also 
 NCEP/NCAR reanalysis

References

Further reading

External links 
 ERA5 Reanalysis Product
 ERA-Interim project
 ERA-40 project
 ERA-15 project

Numerical climate and weather models
Meteorological data and networks